Hell If I Know may refer to:

"Hell If I Know", song by Al Caldwell
"Hell If I Know", song by Chase Bryant